The light multipurpose aircraft T-101 "Grach" or "Rook" in English, was based on the An-2 biplane and planned as a replacement for it. The design is focused on low cost, high reliability, and operating from unprepared airfields. The T-101 can carry 10 passengers, or transport 1600 kg of cargo. It can be used for agricultural, patrol, aerial photography, search and rescue, airborne and other utility functions. The T-101 has a strut-braced high-wing, fixed landing gear with tail wheel and a single engine in the nose.

Specifications

References

External links
 
 
 

1990s Soviet and Russian civil utility aircraft
High-wing aircraft
Single-engined tractor aircraft
Aircraft first flown in 1994